Duckie can mean:
 An informal word for a rubber duck
 Duckie, a character from Pretty in Pink
 Duckie (group), a London-based collective of performance artists
 Derrick "Duckie" Simpson, founding member of reggae band Black Uhuru
 Duckie Thot, an Australian model

See also
 Ducky (disambiguation)
 Duck (disambiguation)